For visits to Commonwealth countries, see List of Commonwealth visits made by Elizabeth II.
For visits to non-Commonwealth countries, see List of state visits made by Elizabeth II.